Ostrovica may refer to:

Albania
 Ostrovicë, or Ostrovica, a mountain

Bosnia and Herzegovina
 Ostrovica, Bosnia and Herzegovina, a village near Kulen Vakuf
 Ostrovica Castle, a castle

Croatia
 Ostrovica, Croatia, a village near Benkovac, in Lišane Ostrovičke municipality 
 Ostrovica Fortress, a castle
 Oštrovica, an interchange on the A6 motorway in Primorje-Gorski Kotar County

Serbia
 Ostrovica, Niška Banja, a village near Niš
 Ostrvica Fortress, or Ostrovica, a castle
 Ostrovica (Tutin), a village
 Ostrovica (Vladičin Han), a village

Slovenia
 Ostrovica, Hrpelje-Kozina, village in Slovenia

See also
 Ostrvica (disambiguation)
 Ostrovitsa, Bulgaria, a village